Renuka Chowdhury  (born 13 August 1954) is an Indian politician and a member of the Indian National Congress, she represented the political party in the Rajya Sabha from Andhra Pradesh. She has also served as the Union minister of State (Independent Charge) for Ministry of Women and Child Development and Tourism in the Government of India.

Early life
Born to Air Commodore Suryanarayana Rao and Vasundhara (Born in Madanapalle) on 13 August 1954 in Vishakhapatnam (Andhra Pradesh). Renuka is the eldest of three daughters. She studied at the Welham Girls' School, Dehradun and received her B.A. in Industrial Psychology from Bangalore University. Renuka was married to Sreedhar Chowdhury in 1973.

Career

Chowdhury entered politics in 1984 as a member of Telugu Desam Party. She was a member of the Rajya Sabha for two consecutive terms and Chief Whip of Telugu Desam Parliamentary party from 1986 to 1998. She was also the Union Minister of State for Health and Family Welfare from 1997 to 1998 in the cabinet of H. D. Deve Gowda. She left Telugu Desam Party to join Congress party in 1998. In 1999 and 2004, she was elected to the 13th and 14th Lok Sabha respectively representing Khammam. Other positions include memberships on the Committee on Finance (1999–2000) and Committee on the Empowerment of Women (2000–2001).

In May 2004 she became the Minister of State for Tourism in the UPA I government. She was the Union minister of State (Independent Charge) for Ministry of Women and Child Development in the UPA I government from January 2006 to May 2009. In the May 2009 Lok Sabha elections, Renuka Chowdary was defeated by Nama Nageswara Rao of TDP from Khammam by 1,24,448 votes.
The Mumbai newspaper, Mid Day, reported in 2009 that, in response to "Sri Ram Sena's Valentine's Day threat" Chowdary said that youth should "swarm" pubs and make a point to the "moral police brigade". After the 2009 Mangalore pub attack by the Sri Ram Sena Chouwdary commented that Mangalore had been "talibanized". This resulted in a case being filed against her by the town's mayor, accusing her of glorifying isolated incidents and making generalized comments about the city. The "Pub Bharo" campaign was actually being headed by her younger daughter Tejaswini.

Chowdary became a spokesperson for the Congress and was re-elected to Rajya Sabha in 2012.

Parliamentary Committees

 Member, Committee on Finance (1999-2000)
 Member, Committee on the Empowerment of Women (2000-2001)
 Member, Committee on Government Assurances (May 2012 – Sept. 2014)
 Member, Committee on Finance (May 2012 – May 2014)
 Member, Business Advisory Committee (May 2013 – Sept. 2014)
 Member, Committee on Agriculture (Sept. 2014–Present)
 Member, House Committee (Sept. 2014–Present)
 Member, General Purposes Committee (April 2016 – Present)
 Chairperson, Committee on Science and Technology, Environment and Forests (April 2016 – 2018)

References

External links
 Renuka Chowdhury profile at India.gov.in

Indian National Congress politicians from Andhra Pradesh
Telugu politicians
India MPs 1999–2004
India MPs 2004–2009
Union ministers of state of India with independent charge
Telangana politicians
Women in Telangana politics
1954 births
Living people
Politicians from Visakhapatnam
Bangalore University alumni
Telugu Desam Party politicians
Women's ministers
Rajya Sabha members from Andhra Pradesh
People from Khammam district
Lok Sabha members from Andhra Pradesh
Women in Andhra Pradesh politics
20th-century Indian women politicians
20th-century Indian politicians
21st-century Indian women politicians
21st-century Indian politicians
Women union ministers of state of India
Women members of the Lok Sabha
Women members of the Rajya Sabha
Welham Girls' School alumni